The term American clock refers to a style of clock design. During the 1600s, when metal was harder to come by in the colonies than wood, works for many American clocks were made of wood, including the gears, which were whittled and fashioned by hand, as were all other parts. There is some evidence that wooden clocks were being made as early as 1715 near New Haven. Benjamin Cheney of East Hartford, Connecticut, was producing wooden striking clocks by 1745.

In the 19th century, many clocks and watches were produced in the United States, especially in Connecticut, where many companies were formed to mass-produce quality timepieces. Makers of American clocks included:
Ansonia Clock Company, 1851–1930
Waterbury Clock Company, 1857–1944
Seth Thomas Clock Company, 1853–1930
W.L. Gilbert & Co., 1845–48 and 1851–66, later Gilbert Mfg. Co., William L. Gilbert Clock Company
Elias Ingraham & Co., 1857–60, 1861–1958
E.N. Welch Mfg. Co., 1864–1903
Sessions Clock Co., 1903–56
New Haven Clock Co., 1853–1960
F. Kroeber Clock Co., 1863–1904
Boston Clock Company, 1884–1894, founded by Joseph Eastman

References

Sources

External links
The American Clock & Watch Museum in Bristol, Connecticut
"Chelsea" Clock Museum
FAQ at "Dave's American Clocks"
Timexpo Museum in Waterbury, Connecticut

Clock designs